German submarine U-861 was a long-range Type IXD2 U-boat built for Nazi Germany's Kriegsmarine during World War II. Laid down in Bremen and launched on 29 April 1943. She was equipped with two stern torpedo tubes and 24 mines.

She was commanded throughout her service life by Korvettenkapitän Jürgen Oesten (Knight's Cross).

Design
German Type IXD2 submarines were considerably larger than the original Type IXs. U-861 had a displacement of  when at the surface and  while submerged. She had two shafts and two  propellers.

U-861 was fitted with six  torpedo tubes (four fitted at the bow and two at the stern), 24 torpedoes, one  SK C/32 naval gun, 150 rounds, and a  Flak M42 with 2575 rounds as well as two  C/30 anti-aircraft guns with 8100 rounds. The boat had a complement of fifty-five.

Service history
She joined 4th Flotilla for training on 2 September 1943, where she remained until 31 March 1944. She then joined 12th Flotilla for active service until 30 September 1944. For her last assignment, she joined 33rd Flotilla, as part of Monsoon Group operating out of Penang in the Indian Ocean, on 1 October 1944 until the end of the war.
On her final long trip back to Norway carrying vital supplies from the Far East, she struck an iceberg south of Greenland, but reached Trondheim safely on 19 April 1945, with very little fuel remaining.

Fate
U-861 surrendered on 9 May 1945 at Trondheim, Norway. She was transferred to Lisahally, Northern Ireland, shortly afterwards.

She was sunk by the Royal Navy on 31 December 1945 in position  as part of Operation Deadlight.

Summary of raiding history

References

Bibliography

External links

World War II submarines of Germany
German Type IX submarines
U-boats commissioned in 1943
U-boats sunk in 1945
Indian Ocean U-Boats
1943 ships
Ships built in Bremen (state)
Maritime incidents in December 1945